Cycling at the 2020 Summer Paralympics took place in two separate locations. Track cycling took place at the Izu Velodrome from 25 to 28 August 2021 and road cycling took place on the Fuji Speedway from 31 August to 3 September 2021.

The 2020 Summer Olympic and Paralympic Games were postponed to 2021 due to the COVID-19 pandemic. They kept the 2020 name and were held from 24 August to 5 September 2021.

The competition was dominated by the squads from Great Britain and The Netherlands, winning 19 gold medals from 51 events. Great Britain, as in 2008, 2012 and 2016 dominated the track events, while the Netherlands were particularly strong in road racing.

Among the highlights were Great Britain's Sarah Storey becoming her country's most successful ever Paralympian, echoing the achievement of Jason Kenny in the 2020 Summer Olympics, winning her 15th, 16th and 17th gold medals in her eighth Paralympic Games.

Classification
Cyclists are given a classification depending on the type and extent of their disability. This method is known as a functional system and was introduced in 2012. Athletes are classified according to their functional ability across four broad categories (blind or partially sighted tandem, handcycle, tricycle and standard bicycle). The class number indicates the severity of impairment with "1" being most impaired. The classification system allows cyclists to compete against others with a similar level of function.

Riders with recovering or deteriorating conditions such as MS are eligible but must have been reclassified within six months of a World Championships or Paralympic Games to ensure their classification is correct. Specialised equipment including prostheses is only allowed where it has been specifically approved.

 B – tandem bicycle
This class is for athletes who have visual impairments and therefore ride tandem bicycles with a sighted cyclist (known as a pilot). B1, B2, and B3 athletes compete together in this class.

 H (1-5) – handcycle
This class is for athletes who are lower limb amputees, have paraplegia, or have involuntary or uncoordinated movement, and ride a handcycle using arms to turn pedals for propulsion. H1–4 cyclists compete in the reclined position, whereas H5 cyclists compete in a kneeling position.

 T (1-2) – tricycle
This class of athletes compete using a tricycle instead of a bicycle, due to lack of balance, or a restriction in the ability to pedal due to muscle tension, or uncoordinated or involuntary movements.
tension, uncoordinated movements or involuntary movements.

 C (1-5) – standard bicycle
This class is for athletes with a limb deficiency, impaired muscle power or range of motion, and impairments affecting co-ordination, such as uncoordinated and involuntary movements.

Factored events
Some cycling events are factored. This can happen when cyclists from different classes compete against each other and means that the results take into account the severity of the impairments of each competitor. As a result, some riders within an event will have their times ‘factored’ while other riders will not, or will have their time factored in a different calculation. The gold medal goes to the athlete with the fastest time after all the required times have been calculated. It is therefore possible for an athlete to break a paralympic or world record in their event for their specific classification, but to finish behind a differently classified athlete in that event after factoring. In such a case, the record is still treated as an official World, or as the case may be, Paralympic Games record within their classification for that event.

Participating nations
As of June 2021

 (Host nation)

Medal table

Medalists

Road cycling

Men's events

Women's events

Mixed team event

Track cycling

Men's events

Women's events

Mixed events

See also
Cycling at the 2020 Summer Olympics

References

External links
Results book – Cycling Road 
Results book – Cycling Track 

2020 Summer Paralympics events
2020
Paralympics
Cycle races in Japan